Stephen Parke (born 1950) is a New Zealand physicist. He is a Distinguished Scientist and former Head of the Theoretical Physics Department at the Fermi National Accelerator Laboratory (Batavia, Illinois).

Born in Gisborne, New Zealand, Parke attended Edmund Campion College, Gisborne and  St Peter's College, Auckland and the University of Auckland in New Zealand. He was a graduate student of Sidney Coleman at Harvard University, obtaining a PhD in theoretical particle physics in 1980. He held a postdoctoral fellowship at the Stanford Linear Accelerator Center (1980–1983) before moving to the Fermi National Accelerator Laboratory.

Field of work
He is an originator of Parke–Taylor amplitudes, which he developed with his colleague, Tomasz Taylor. Parke-Taylor amplitudes represent a new approach to computing scattering amplitudes in quantum chromodynamics using symmetry methods such as supersymmetry. Parke is also an expert on neutrino physics as well as the physics of the top quark.

See also
 List of alumni of St Peter's College, Auckland for more biographical details

References

External links
 Parke's scientific publications are available on the INSPIRE-HEP Literature Database .
HEPNames profile: Stephen Parke
Stephen Parke at Fermilab Theoretical Physics Department

Particle physicists
Neutrino physicists
21st-century American physicists
Harvard University alumni
American people of New Zealand descent
New Zealand scientists
New Zealand physicists
University of Auckland alumni
People from Gisborne, New Zealand
1950 births
Living people
People educated at St Peter's College, Auckland
Fellows of the American Physical Society
Theoretical physicists
People associated with Fermilab
People educated at Campion College, Gisborne